Michael Clarke (born Michael James Dick; June 3, 1946 – December 19, 1993) was an American musician, best known as the drummer for the 1960s rock group the Byrds from 1964 to 1967.  He died in 1993, at age 47, from liver failure, a direct result of more than three decades of heavy alcohol consumption.

Biography

Early years
Clarke was born in Spokane, Washington. His father was a pipefitter and his mother was an amateur musician. Clarke left home when he was 17 years old and hitchhiked to California to become a musician. In legend, Clarke was said to have been discovered by Byrds' founder David Crosby while playing bongos on a beach. In fact he was discovered by singer-songwriter Ivan Ulz, in North Beach, San Francisco, and was introduced to other group members by Ulz.

The Byrds
Clarke was not an accomplished musician prior to joining the Byrds but he did have previous experience of drumming in his younger years before joining the group. He had played the drums before but, after joining the Byrds, not having a drum set, practiced on a makeshift kit of cardboard boxes and a tambourine, but he did have real drum sticks.  According to lead guitarist Roger McGuinn's web site, Clarke was hired by McGuinn and Gene Clark for his resemblance to Rolling Stones' guitarist Brian Jones. Clarke's strength as a drummer is considered to be illustrated by his jazz-oriented playing on the Byrds' "Eight Miles High", on the Fifth Dimension album.

Unlike the other members of the Byrds, Clarke was not a prolific songwriter.  His compositional contributions with the band encompass co-writing credits for the songs "Captain Soul", an instrumental from the Fifth Dimension album (based on Lee Dorsey's "Get Out Of My Life, Woman"), and "Artificial Energy" from The Notorious Byrd Brothers.  He was also given an arrangement co-credit for two traditional songs that appeared on Fifth Dimension: "Wild Mountain Thyme" and "John Riley" (although the latter is credited to Bob Gibson and songwriter/arranger Ricky Neff on the album itself).

In August 1967, during the recording sessions for The Notorious Byrd Brothers album, Clarke walked out on the Byrds and was temporarily replaced by session drummers Jim Gordon and Hal Blaine.  Clarke had recently become dissatisfied with his role in the band and didn't particularly like the new material that the songwriting members were providing.  However, Clarke continued to honor his live concert commitments, appearing at a handful of shows during late August and early September 1967.  Clarke returned from his self-imposed exile in time to contribute drums to the song "Artificial Energy" in early December 1967, but was subsequently fired from the band by McGuinn and bass player Chris Hillman once The Notorious Byrd Brothers album was completed.

Hiatus from music, Dillard and Clark and Flying Burrito Brothers

After a short stint in Hawaii working in the hotel business and pursuing his interest in painting, Clarke played briefly with Gene Clark in Dillard and Clark, before following Hillman and Gram Parsons to country-rock pioneers The Flying Burrito Brothers, after their first album had been recorded. Clarke served with the Burritos between early 1969 and 1972, appearing with the band at the infamous Altamont Free Concert in California, headlined by The Rolling Stones, in December 1969.  During the 1974-1980 period, Clarke was a member of Firefall, followed by a period as the drummer for Jerry Jeff Walker, ending in 1982.

Byrds lawsuit controversy and Hall of Fame induction
Between 1983 and 1985, Clarke joined former Byrds' singer Gene Clark in The Firebyrds, a touring band which had been put together to promote Gene Clark's 1984 solo album Firebyrd.  In 1985, following the breakup of The Firebyrds, Clarke and Clark again joined forces for a series of controversial shows billed as a "20th Anniversary Tribute to The Byrds".  Among the other musicians involved in this project were John York, another ex-Byrd from the late 1960s line-up of the group, ex-Burritos and Firefall singer Rick Roberts, ex-member of The Beach Boys early 1970s line-up Blondie Chaplin, and Rick Danko, formerly of The Band. Many nightclubs simply shortened the billing to "The Byrds," and the pair soon found themselves involved in acrimonious court battles with Roger McGuinn, David Crosby, and Chris Hillman over use of the group's name.
  
The Byrds set aside their differences long enough to appear together at their induction into the Rock & Roll Hall of Fame in January 1991, where the original lineup played three songs together: "Mr. Tambourine Man", "Turn! Turn! Turn!" and "I'll Feel a Whole Lot Better".  Gene Clark died less than five months later, of a heart attack, on May 24, 1991.

From 1987 until his death in 1993, Clarke toured as The Byrds featuring Michael Clarke.  Skip Battin and John York, who had played with Roger McGuinn in later versions of the Byrds, also played at various points in The Byrds featuring Michael Clarke.  Following the failure of McGuinn, Crosby and Hillman to obtain an injunction against Clarke, it was generally accepted that Clarke's continuing usage of the name was tantamount to ownership, particularly when not used by any other group member and where other group members, particularly Roger McGuinn, had repeatedly denied any interest in performing again under the Byrds name. Roger McGuinn later acknowledged that ownership of the Byrds name had likely passed to Michael Clarke's estate upon Clarke's death, but David Crosby secured the rights to the band's name in 2002.

Declining health and death
By the late 1980s, Clarke's health had declined from a lifetime of hard drinking, resulting in a number of hospital stays. He died of liver failure at the age of 47 at his Treasure Island, Florida, condominium on December 19, 1993.  Billy Moore, who had organized a New Year's Eve concert at a resort where Clarke and his band were scheduled to perform, stated that at the time of his death, Clarke had recently learned that he had become terminally ill due to his liver problems.

During his final days, Clarke had expressed a wish to appear on television in the hope of alerting children to the dangers of alcoholism.  Following his wishes, Clarke's girlfriend Susan Paul started a foundation in Clarke's name, called the Campaign for Alcohol-Free Kids.

In 1994, a year after his death, Clarke's paintings were published in Dick Gautier and Jim McMullan's book, Musicians As Artists.

Discography
 The Byrds: Mr. Tambourine Man (1965)
 The Byrds: Turn! Turn! Turn! (1965)
 The Byrds: Fifth Dimension (1966)
 Gene Clark: Gene Clark with the Gosdin Brothers (1967)
 The Byrds: Younger Than Yesterday (1967)
 The Byrds: The Notorious Byrd Brothers (1968)
 The Byrds: Never Before  (1987)
 The Byrds: Byrds   (1973) (Reunion of the five original members)
 Flying Burrito Bros: Burrito Deluxe (1970)
 Flying Burrito Bros: The Flying Burrito Bros (1971)
 Flying Burrito Bros: Last of the Red Hot Burritos (1972)
 Flying Burrito Bros: Close Up the Honky Tonks  (1974)
 Gram Parsons: Sleepless Nights  (1976)
 Roger McGuinn: Roger McGuinn  (1973)  (one track)
 Firefall: Firefall (1976)
 Firefall: Luna Sea (1977)
 Firefall: Elan (1978)
 Firefall: Undertow (1980)
 Chris Hillman: Clear Sailin''' (1977) (one track)
 Barry McGuire: Barry McGuire And The Doctor (album) (1971)
 Gene Clark: Early L.A. Sessions (album) (1972)
 Gene Clark: Roadmaster (album) (1973)
 Terry Melcher: Terry Melcher (album) (1974)
 Jerry Jeff Walker: Cow Jazz (album) (1980)
 The Legacy Album (cassette only album)(one track "The Flame") Michael Clarke's Byrds (1991)
 Zuma (album) Country Funk'' (recorded 1971, released 2011)

References

External links 
Letter from Michael to Kids

1946 births
1993 deaths
Musicians from Spokane, Washington
American rock drummers
The Byrds members
The Flying Burrito Brothers members
Alcohol-related deaths in Florida
Firefall members
American folk rock musicians
American country drummers
Musicians from Los Angeles
People from Treasure Island, Florida
20th-century American drummers
American male drummers